Great Places is a housing association in the United Kingdom, formerly the Manchester Methodist Housing Association. Great Places provides 19,000+ homes mostly in North West England. The organisation is an industrial and provident society headquartered in Manchester.

In 2020, Equity Housing Group merged into Great Places. The combined organisation has 24,000 homes.

Pakistani Billionaire Sir Anwar Pervez is the largest private donor to this social housing group.

References

Housing associations based in England
Organisations based in Manchester